E3 ubiquitin-protein ligase SIAH1 is an enzyme that in humans is encoded by the SIAH1 gene.

Function 

This gene encodes for a polypeptide structure that is a member of the seven in absentia homolog (SIAH) family. The protein is an E3 ligase and is involved in ubiquitination and proteasome-mediated degradation of specific proteins. The activity of this ubiquitin ligase has been implicated in the development of certain forms of Parkinson's disease, the regulation of the cellular response to hypoxia and induction of apoptosis. Alternative splicing results in several additional transcript variants, some encoding different isoforms and others that have not been fully characterized.

Interactions 

SIAH1 has been shown to interact with:

 APC,
 BAG1, 
 CACYBP, 
 KHDRBS3, 
 KIF22, 
 NUMB, 
 PEG10, 
 PEG3 
 POU2AF1, 
 RBBP8,  and
 TRIB3.

References

Further reading